Kalaignanam (born K. M. Balakrishnan), is an Indian writer, actor, producer and director who works in Tamil films.

Early life
Kalaignanam was born in Elumalai Village.

Cinema career
Rajinikanth essayed first independent lead role in the movie Bairavi produced by Kalaignanam. Bairavai movie was produced under the production company name Valli Velan movies. After the success of the movie later Kalaignanam produced his movies under the production company name Bhairavi productions.

Partial filmography

{| class="wikitable"
|+ As story writer
|-
! Film !! Year
|-
| Kathal Paduthum Padu || 1966
|-
| Veguli Penn|| 1971
|-
|Kurathi Magan||1972
|-
|Anbai Thedi ||
|-
|Thangathile Vairam ||
|-
|Kanavan Manaivi ||
|-
|Bairavi||1978
|-
|Ilanjodigal ||
|-
|Miruthanga Chakravarthi||1983
|-
|Amman Kovil Thiruvizha ||
|-
|Pudhupatti Ponnuthaayi ||
|-
|}

Books
He has written his cinema experiences as four volume of books named Cinema secret''.

Personal life
Kalaignanam's elder son Murugan died in September 2017.

References

External links

Tamil writers
Tamil film directors
Tamil film producers
Tamil film poets
Tamil actors
Tamil screenwriters
Living people
Indian screenwriters
Indian film producers
Year of birth missing (living people)